Moin Khan (born 24 October 1995) is a Bangladeshi cricketer. He made his first-class debut for Barisal Division in the 2016–17 National Cricket League on 27 December 2016. He made his List A debut for Khelaghar Samaj Kallyan Samity in the 2016–17 Dhaka Premier Division Cricket League on 15 May 2017. He made his Twenty20 debut on 31 May 2021, for Partex Sporting Club in the 2021 Dhaka Premier Division Twenty20 Cricket League.

References

External links
 

1995 births
Living people
Bangladeshi cricketers
Barisal Division cricketers
Khelaghar Samaj Kallyan Samity cricketers
Partex Sporting Club cricketers
Place of birth missing (living people)